The 2020 All-Ireland Senior Ladies' Football Championship was the 47th edition of the Ladies' Gaelic Football Association's premier inter-county ladies' Gaelic Football tournament.

The impact of the COVID-19 pandemic on Gaelic games forced the delay of the tournament until late in the year, and it was shortened, with no provincial championships taking place.

 were the winners for the fourth year in a row.

Format

Group stage
The 12 teams are drawn into four groups of three teams. Each team play each other team in its group once, earning three points for a win and one for a draw.

Knockout stage
The winners of each group compete in the All-Ireland semi-finals.

Teams

Venues

Fixtures and results

Group games took place between 30 October and 15 November 2020.

Group stage

Group 1 Table Result

Group 1 Results

Group 2 Table Result

Group 2 Results

Group 3 Table Result

Group 3 Results

Group 4 Table Result

Group 4 Results

All-Ireland Semi-Finals

After the semi-final between Cork and Galway, LGFA president Marie Hickey criticised the Galway ladies for not vacating their dressing room in sufficient time to complete their warm-up, after they complained about being hurried into doing so.

All-Ireland final

Awards

Player of the Year

TG4 Senior Players' Player of the Year – Aimee Mackin

Senior Team of the Year

Championship Statistics

(1.) Scoring List (2.) Team Stats

Miscellaneous Statistics

Most Goals by Team in the Season – 13 goals  
Most Points by Team in the Season – 53 points  
Top Scorer in a Single Game – Sarah Rowe (2,09) 15 points (  vs  ) (Group 4 Round 2)
Widest Winning Margin – 25 points (  (4–17) vs (0–04)  ) (Group 4 Round 2)
Most Goals in a Single Match – 9 goals   (3–13) vs (6–16)   &   (2–06) vs (7–09)  
Most Points in a Single Match – 30 points   (2–17) vs (0–13)   (Semi-Final 2)
Most Goals by One Team in a Match – 7 goals   (2–06) vs (7–09)   (Group 1 Round 3)
Highest Aggregate Score in a Single Match – 56 points   (3–13) vs (6–16)   (Group 4 Round 1)
Lowest Aggregate Score in a Single Match – 21 points   (1–10) vs (1–05)   (Final)

See also
2020 All-Ireland Intermediate Ladies' Football Championship
2020 All-Ireland Junior Ladies' Football Championship
All-Ireland Intermediate Ladies' Football Championship
All-Ireland Junior Ladies' Football Championship
Ladies' Gaelic football
Ladies' Gaelic Football Association
Previous Ladies' Gaelic Football All Stars Awards
All-Ireland Senior Ladies' Football Championship
Ladies' National Football League

References

2020 in Ladies' Gaelic football
2020 in women's sport
Ladies' All-Ireland Championship
2020 in Irish sport
Ladies' Gaelic football
Women's sport in Ireland
Women's sports competitions in Ireland
Women's team sports